is a Japanese actor who is known for his role as Takeshi Yamato in the 1980 Ultraman 80 series. In this series, he is played the lead role as a school teacher who is also a UGM member.

Filmography

Drama series
1980: Ultraman 80
1994: Furuhata Ninzaburo
1994: Hana no Ran
1996: Kenpō wa Madaka, Jirō Shirasu
2000: Aoi Tokugawa Sandai, Maeda Toshinaga
2001: Kizudarake no Love Song
2006: Desuyone
2006: Pure Heart
2006: Ultraman Mebius (Episode 41)
2007: Yukan Club
2008: Salaryman Kintaro
2008: 4 Shimai Tantei Dan
2010: The Wallflower
2013: Honey Trap
2014: Paper Moon
2015: Wild Heroes
2021: Karei-naru Ichizoku
2021: Enjoy Drinking Alone

Movies
1982: The Rape
1987: Gondola
1995: Gamera: Guardian of the Universe
1996: Gamera 2: Advent of Legion
2010: Ultraman Zero The Movie: Super Deciding Fight! The Belial Galactic Empire
2012: Love for Beginners
2017: Hurricane Polymar
2021: The Grapes of Joy
2022: Ring Wandering
2022: Signature
2023: In Love and Deep Water

Theatre
2011: Legend of the Galactic Heroes – Galactic Kaiser Friedrich IV
2017-2019: Legally Blonde - Professor Callaghan

References

1.^ "Japanese Talent Directory Handbook 2004" VIP Times, 2004, p. 296.  .
2.^ Kunimaru Japan 　Culture Broadcasting　December 30, 2015
3.^ " Theater Creator Musical" Cutie Blonde " " Toho ( October 29, 2016 ). Viewed October 29, 2016 .

External links
 

Japanese male film actors
Japanese male television actors
Japanese male musical theatre actors
1955 births
People from Hokkaido
Living people
20th-century Japanese male actors
21st-century Japanese male actors